733 Mocia is a minor planet orbiting the Sun.  A possible occultation was observed by Oscar Canales Moreno on October 1, 2001.

See also
 List of minor planets/701–800
 Meanings of minor planet names: 501–1000

References

External links
 
 

Cybele asteroids
Mocia
Mocia
CF-type asteroids (Tholen)
19120916